HMS St Sampson was a Saint-class tug launched in 1919.

The ship was ordered during World War I and was built by Hong Kong and Whampoa Dock. St Sampson was a tug boat specializing in rescue operations in hazardous waters. She was delivered to the Hong Kong Naval Yard in January 1920, after the war had ended. As a result, she was not put in commission and was offered on sale in 1921. She was at first sold to Wheelock and Company, but they defaulted on payment, and she was later sold to another company. By 1941, she was made part of the Hong Kong Royal Naval Volunteer Reserve, and was present during the Battle of Hong Kong.

She was damaged in the process and on 7 March, she foundered, and her crew was picked up by the hospital ship Dorsetshire.

References

1919 ships
Ships built in Hong Kong
Tugboats of the Royal Navy
World War II auxiliary ships of the United Kingdom
World War II auxiliary ships of Hong Kong
Maritime incidents in March 1942